Oliver Adrián Toledo Morandé (born 17 September 1987) is a Chilean former professional footballer who played as a forward. 

He played for clubs like Audax Italiano or Iberia.

Honours
Audax Italiano
 Primera División de Chile: runner-up 2006 Clausura

References
 
 

1987 births
Living people
Chilean footballers
Association football forwards
Primera B de Chile players
Chilean Primera División players
Deportes Iberia footballers
Curicó Unido footballers
Coquimbo Unido footballers
Audax Italiano footballers